The Communist Labour Party (abbreviated PCO) was a political party in Colombia. The party was led by Augusto Durán and was born out of a right-wing split in the Colombian Communist Party in mid-1947. Durán, who had been the general secretary of the Communist Party, and his followers had wanted that the Communist Party would support the presidential candidature of Jorge Eliécer Gaitán. Durán became the general secretary of PCO. The PCO published Clase Obrera. The PCO became short-lived, after three years most PCO members had rejoined the Communist Party.

References

1947 establishments in Colombia
Communist parties in Colombia
Defunct political parties in Colombia
Political parties established in 1947
Labour parties